My Life as a Popat is a British television series for children which follows the lives of a British-Indian family, through the eyes of their eldest son, Anand. The first series revolves around the teenager fighting the embarrassment his family causes him. The second series brings a change in the storyline, with Anand's genius brother Chetan Popat sometimes taking centre stage. Milli Patel (the Popats' cousin) also joins the family's adventures in this series.

Cast
Sonny Gill Dulay - Anand Popat
Kulvinder Ghir - Ramesh Popat
Shaheen Khan - Shoba Popat
Chandeep Uppal - Dimple Popat
James Gandhi - Chetan Popat
Laura Greenwood - Holly Saviour (Series 1 and one episode of Series 2)
Felicity Montagu - Ivy Saviour (Series 1 and one episode of Series 2)
Dave Hill - Alf Saviour (Series 1)
Yasmin Paige - Lucy Miesels (Series 2)
Manjeeven Grewal - Milli Patel (Series 2)

Trivia
My Life as a Popat was not recommissioned after the second series due to CITV budget restrains. However, after the show won a BAFTA, a second series was commissioned.
Laura Greenwood (Holly Saviour) was axed in the second series so (after a farewell appearance in the first episode) the character was written out. The new character of Lucy Miesels (played by Yasmin Paige) was introduced in the next episode.

Following further budget cuts to CITV My Life as a Popat was not recommissioned for a third series.

Game
CITV made a My Life as a Popat game which can be found on the CITV website:

Episodes

Series 1 (2004)

Series 2 (2007)

Awards and nominations

References

External links 
 My Life as a Popat at itv.com/citv
 

2004 British television series debuts
2007 British television series endings
Television shows set in London
ITV children's television shows
Television series about families